Forage cap is the designation given to various types of military undress, fatigue or working headwear. These vary widely in form, according to country or period. The coloured peaked cap worn by the modern British Army for parade and other dress occasions is still officially designated as a forage cap.

History
In the 18th century, forage caps were small cloth caps worn by British cavalrymen when undertaking work duties such as foraging for food for their horses. The term was later applied to undress caps worn by men of all branches and regiments as a substitute for the full dress headdress.

Usage

French Army
During the French Revolutionary Wars, French soldiers made their own forage caps from the sleeve of an old coat. By the 1940s, the beret was also widely worn by paratroop and mountain units.

German Army
The German army was the first to use the peaked cap, in the final years of the Napoleonic Wars. When the Pickelhaube was introduced in the 1840s, the Germans adopted a new, peakless forage cap, resembling the sailor cap. Prior to 1914 these caps were worn in a wide variety of colours according to regiment or branch, with Prussian blue the most common.
However in the early weeks of World War I these were replaced with a slate grey version, with a dark green cap band. After World War I, the German Wehrmacht used a variant of the garrison cap called the Feldmütze, before adopting the Austrian-style ski cap of the Gebirgsjäger.

Austro-Hungarian Army, Austrian Army, and Royal Hungarian Army
The Austro-Hungarian Army adopted a cap in the 19th Century fitted with a peak and cloth chinstraps (or flaps). The chinstraps could be buttoned over the forehead, either securing the folded-up peak or leaving it loose, or could be buttoned under the chin, extending the rear of the cap downwards to protect the ears from the elements. This cap continues in military (Österreichisches Bundesheer), border guard (Österreichs Garde), and police use with the Republic of Austria, although the camouflaged version worn today retains the only peak, not the chinstraps, of its predecessor). After the break-up of the Austro-Hungarian Empire, the Royal Hungarian Army had also continued to issue this type of cap. Variations on this cap were adopted by other armies, including the British Army.

United Kingdom

British Army and Royal Marines
In the British Army, infantry forage caps were first regulated by the War Office in 1811 as a practical head dress that could be worn off duty,  in barracks or in camp, in place of the cumbersome shakos and various forms of helmet comprising regimental headdress.  Before this date, forage caps were worn as ordered regimentally.  Mentioned in sources as early as 1768, these took on various forms, in some instances being made up locally using parts of worn out uniforms.  When not in use, forage caps could either be stowed in knapsacks or strapped to the cartouche case. The caps ordered in 1811 were of knitted and felted wool, blue-grey in colour with a white band around the base. Following the end of the Napoleonic wars, forage caps were once again sourced regimentally and took the form of round bonnets in a variety of shapes, frequently made up of cloth in regimental facing colours.  In 1829, these regimental forage caps were regulated by order to impose uniformity and then in 1834 replaced by a plain cap of knitted felt wool, known as a Kilmarnock Bonnet (from the place of manufacture in southwest Scotland).

The Kilmarnock forage cap was superseded in kilted Highland regiments by the Glengarry bonnet in 1851. The rest of the infantry, including the foot guards, continued to wear versions of the Kilmarnock until 1868, when the remaining regiments of foot also adopted the Glengarry. The foot guards who retained a round forage cap, together with a folding side cap, worn in working dress and in camp. In 1897, the Glengarry was replaced by the "Austrian cap" (or side cap).

The Dress Regulations for the Army of 1900 described, and provided photographs of, several different models of forage cap. These included the staff pattern with wider crown and leather peak; the model worn by the Household Cavalry with straight sides and peak; and that worn by cavalry regiments a small round cap without a peak, braided and coloured according to regimental pattern, worn at an angle on the head and held in place by a leather chin strap.

In 1902 a new style of forage cap, named after the then Secretary of State for War, St John Brodrick, replaced the Austrian cap.  The 'Brodrick cap' took the form of a stiffened and round shaped forage cap with no peak that was not dissimilar in appearance to a sailor's hat, although it was dark blue in colour and had a patch of facing colour cloth behind the regimental badge, which was worn centrally at the front.

In 1905 the Brodrick was replaced by a broad-topped cap with wired brim and leather peak, based on the pattern worn in the Royal Navy, which was introduced as a "forage cap" for off-duty 'walking out' and other semi-formal occasions. Under the same name, a slightly modified version of this cap is currently worn by most modern British regiments with No. 1 ceremonial and No. 2 khaki parade dress. The body of this headdress is generally dark blue (hussar and lancer regiments wear scarlet forage caps while The Rifles wear dark green), the cap bands are red for "royal" regiments and corps, or in regimental colours.

The Parachute Regiment do not wear forage caps, favoring instead maroon berets.

The Royal Marines continued to wear the Brodrick into the 1930s with parade and walking out dress. Before the First World War, a khaki cover with integral peak was issued to wear over it in the field with khaki service dress, but the army's khaki service dress cap replaced this during the war.

Royal Air Force
The Royal Air Force (RAF) field service cap is often called a forage cap (and is also colloquially known as the chip bag or Thunderbird hat).  It has no peak, and because of its longitudinal cut is called a 'fore-and-after'.  Its two ornamental buttons at the front can be unfastened in order to let down earflaps for harsh weather. (The German Army forage cap of the Second World War was similar, but of two distinct types, one with an eye-shading peak or bill, the other without.)   Available to be worn by all ranks (officers and other ranks) when working dress is ordered, the field service caps worn by group captains and above have additional light blue ('Minerva blue') piping.

The field service cap was worn by RAF personnel for everyday purposes from 1936, completely superseding the previously worn peaked cap in December 1939, until about 1950, when it was superseded by the RAF blue beret (introduced after the Second World War) for officers of the RAF Regiment and all other ranks, and the SD cap for other officers. RAF field service caps can still be bought privately and worn on duty by all ranks as working dress.  They are commonly worn with flying suits, as they are easier to stow in a side pocket or cockpit than SD caps, but only air vice-marshals and above are authorised to wear them with combat uniform.  The fore-and-after is still worn by airmen in other services, such as the US Air Force and the Royal Canadian Air Force.

United States military

The M1825 forage cap (also known as the pinwheel cap) was worn by the United States military from 1825 to 1833 when it began to be replaced by the M1833 forage cap.  It was used in conflicts such as the Black Hawk War of 1832, the 2nd Seminole war of 1835-1842, and the Winnebago War of 1827 by American forces. The cap was also adopted by the Texan Army and worn by American volunteers in the Texas revolution from 1835 to 1836. The M1839 cap of the Mexican War was of a somewhat similar pattern to the 1833 cap with it becoming a visor cap made in navy blue wool. It also added universal neck-flaps, whereas the 1833 only had neckflaps on the dragoon variant. In the Civil War the M1858 forage cap, based on the French kepi, was the most common headgear worn by union troops even though it was described by one soldier as "Shapeless as a feedbag". There were two types of brims: the first, called the McClellan cap was flat; the second, called the McDowell cap, was curved. U.S. Army regulations called for insignia to be put on the top of the cap, with branch of service (infantry, cavalry or artillery) in the middle, company letter above and the regimental number below. In 1863 the corps badge was introduced in the Army of the Potomac in an attempt to boost morale among the troops; this badge was also added to the cap. If the soldier was in the infantry the bugle horn was put below the disk, with the regimental number inside the infantry horn, the company letter above the horn and the corp badge above that. More frequently than not the soldier lacked this degree of insignia. Occasionally, the branch of service, company letter or regimental number insignia was also used. After the Civil War, the forage cap fell into disuse; it was rarely worn, but was in use until the 1870s.

See also

 Campaign hat
 Kepi
 Side cap

References

Military uniforms
Caps
Civil War military equipment of the United States
Military hats